Nishina (written: 仁科) is a Japanese surname. Notable people with the surname include:

 Akiko Nishina (born 1953), Japanese actress
 Nishina Morinobu (1557–1582), retainer of the Japanese samurai clan of Takeda during the closing years of the Sengoku period
 Yoshio Nishina (1890–1951), Japanese physicist

See also
 Nishina (crater)
 Nishina Memorial Prize
 Nishina Shinmei Shrine

Japanese-language surnames